The Sumner Family is a prominent political and agricultural family based throughout the eastern United States in what was formally known as the Thirteen Colonies, primarily in Massachusetts, Virginia, North Carolina, and Georgia. The family, who accumulated power through the generational efforts of statesmen, military leaders, and planters can trace its ancestry back to Oxfordshire, England. The Sumner Family as it is known today emigrated to the United States throughout the mid to late 1600s, while a branch of the family maintained itself in England and obtained high ranking positions in the Church of England such as John Bird Sumner who went on to become the Archbishop of Canterbury from 1848 to 1862. 

Descendants of the family who emigrated to the United States proved to be successful statesmen and military leaders with many of those family members becoming early settlers of areas such as Dorchester, Massachusetts, now part of Boston, along with settlements and plantations along the James River in the Virginia Colony, such as Nansemond. 

Prominent individuals include:
The Massachusetts Sumners
Increase Sumner, The 5th Governor of Massachusetts
William H. Sumner, The Son of Governor Increase Sumner and an early Massachusetts historian
Charles Sumner, A prominent U.S. Senator, statesman, and abolitionist during the U.S. Civil War
Edwin Vose Sumner, A Union General during the U.S. Civil War.
Edwin Vose Sumner Jr., A Union General during the U.S. Civil War
Samuel S. Sumner, A U.S. Army General during the later 19th Century
James B. Sumner, Nobel Prize in Chemistry
Jessie Sumner, U.S. Representative from Illinois
Thomas Waldron Sumner, architect
Thomas Hubbard Sumner, navigator
Allen Melancthon Sumner, US Marine Corps
George G. Sumner, Lieutenant Governor of Connecticut
John Colton Sumner, explorer
George D. Gould, American financier and banker
The Virginia Sumners
Jethro Sumner, A General of the Continental Army during the American Revolutionary War
The Warwickshire Sumners
John Bird Sumner, Archbishop of Canterbury
Charles Richard Sumner, bishop
George Sumner, bishop
Heywood Sumner, artist

References 

Sumner family
Families from Massachusetts
Families from Virginia
Families from Georgia (U.S. state)
Political families of the United States